Tobie Jacques Verwey (born 9 December 1989) is a South African professional rugby union player, who most recently played with the . His regular position is flanker.

Career

Youth

At school level, Verwey played for Hoërskool Middelburg, where he earned an inclusion in the  Under-18 side for the Academy Week tournament in 2007  and also played for the  side in the 2007 Under-19 Provincial Championship. He captained the school's first team in 2008 and played for the  side in the 2008 Under-21 Provincial Championship before a spell with the s in the Under-19 Provincial Championship.

Pumas

While mainly playing for the  side during the 2009 Under-21 Provincial Championship, he also made three appearances in the 2009 Currie Cup First Division.

Blue Bulls and UP Tuks

Verwey returned to Pretoria in 2010, making a single appearance for the  side in the 2010 Under-21 Provincial Championship, as well as playing club rugby for university side  in the Carlton League.

Verwey also represented  in three editions of the Varsity Cup competition. He played in six matches of the 2013 Varsity Cup competition as UP Tuks successfully defended their title, with Verwey starting the final and helping them beat the  44–5 in Stellenbosch.

Falcons

He immediately established himself as a first-team regular, starting twelve of their matches during the 2013 Currie Cup First Division.

He also played in all six of their matches (contributing one try in their match against the ) during the 2014 Currie Cup qualification series as the Falcons failed to qualify for the Premier Division of the competition, instead securing a spot in the 2014 Currie Cup First Division.

References

South African rugby union players
Living people
1989 births
People from Middelburg, Mpumalanga
Rugby union flankers
Blue Bulls players
Falcons (rugby union) players
Pumas (Currie Cup) players
Rugby union players from Mpumalanga